"Here We Go Again" is a song by English drum and bass duo Sigma, featuring vocals from English singer Louisa. It was released on 29 March 2019 by 3 Beat Records as the third single from the duo's second studio album, Hope. The song peaked at number 98 on the UK Singles Chart.

Charts

References

2019 singles
2019 songs
Sigma songs